José María Pasquini Durán (1939 in Salta – 13 February 2010 in Buenos Aires) was an Argentine journalist, writer, teacher, political analyst, and one of the main writers of the newspaper Pagina 12, that he helped to found.

Trajectory 

In 1960, he started to work as freelance editor in union newspapers, one of them were the "CGT de los Argentinos" of Raimundo Ongaro, in which redaction was mate of Rodolfo Walsh.
He was prosecretary of the redaction of Revista Panorama.
He was also secretary of the redaction of the Colombian newspaper La Opinión, of Jacobo Timerman, El Periodista and Página 12, where he was politic editorialist since its foundation in 1987.
During the last military dictatorship he was Latin American director of the IPS agency from Roma.

Radio 

He directed and led news programs in TV and radio. In the 1980s, with the recovery of the democracy, LR3 Radio Belgrano put in the air renovator programs like "Stories in Study".

TV 

He was supplier of the TV channels intervention. Carlos Ulanovsky remembers:

"The 1974 September 13, they don't let enter Mirtha Legrand to Canal 13 and they notify her that her program was prohibited (...) The coordanator, Alicia Norton, learns by Pasquini Durán that the program is over."

Pasquini Durán was a creative part of the miniserie Men in Conflict a rarity by Canal 7 Argentina commissioned by a sector of military hoping to show that in those hard times as Juan Manuel de Rosas with battles between units and federals, could also have agreements:

Together with José María Pasquini Durán and Roberto Cossa (also prohibited by the dictatorship), the screenwriters should overcome one of the biggest challenges: talk about what they are asked to say, but use all the possible strategies for the eye of the censor don't see what the spectator would see. The writers work hard to see how much they can say without the dictatorship intervening and destroying books.

Academic 

 He made academic activities in the National University of La Plata and in the University of Buenos Aires
 He gave conferences and participated in seminars in Argentina and abroad, during the latest thirty years.
He worked in Bolivia, Colombia, Costa Rica, Cuba, Ecuador, Guyana, Italia, Mexico, Nicaragua, Panamá, Perú and Venezuela.

Consultancies 

He was consultant of:
UNESCO
Latin American Economic System
Andean Community of Nations
United Nations Population Fund
World Association for Christian Communication
Latin American Council of Churches

Death 

He died on 13 February 2010 of a cardiac arrest in the Buenos Aires clinic Trinidad, where he was interned since two days before.

References 

1939 births
2010 deaths
People from Salta
Argentine male writers
Argentine journalists
Male journalists
Argentine communists